Dhonas is an Indian sweet made from jackfruit or cucumber, rava, coconut and jaggery.

External links
Dhondas recipe

Indian desserts
Konkani cuisine